Kagerup railway station is a railway junction located in the central part of the Gribskov forest, about  west of the village of Kagerup in North Zealand, Denmark.

Kagerup railway station is located on the Gribskov Line. At Kagerup the railway line from Hillerød splits into two branches to the seaside resort towns of Tisvildeleje and Gilleleje. The train services are operated by the railway company Lokaltog which runs frequent local train services from Hillerød station to Tisvildeleje station and Gilleleje station.

See also 
 List of railway stations in Denmark

References

External links

 Lokaltog
 Gribskovbanen on jernbanen.dk

Railway stations in the Capital Region of Denmark
Buildings and structures in Gribskov Municipality
Railway stations opened in 1880
Railway stations in Denmark opened in the 19th century